The Chinese short-limbed skink or Chinese ateuchosaurus (Ateuchosaurus chinensis) is a species of skink. It is found in China and Vietnam.

References

chinensis
Reptiles of China
Reptiles of Vietnam
Reptiles described in 1845
Taxa named by John Edward Gray